Dmitri Shostakovich's String Quartet No. 6 in G major, Op. 101, was composed in 1956.  It was premiered by the Beethoven Quartet but carries no dedication. The Beethoven Quartet recorded this work on the Mezhdunarodnaya Kniga label.

Structure

It consists of four movements:

Playing time is approximately 22 minutes.

The Allegretto first movement creates a carefree mood using nursery tunes. The second movement is a cheerful round dance in E major, the third movement a chaconne in B minor. The final movement leads into a complex Allegretto showing the influence of both Alban Berg's Lyric Suite and Richard Strauss's Metamorphosen.  The quartet also features the only vertical appearance of the DSCH motif (the notes D, E, C, and B played at the same time).  This happens at the cadence at the end of each movement.

The quartet was written in Komarovo, Russia.

External links
  
 

06
1956 compositions
Compositions in G major